Splashdown Two is a 1997 CD release and expansion of the previous Hot Tuna vinyl release from 1984, Splashdown.  It is a recording of a live acoustic performance from the mid-1970s that had played on the short-lived radio station WQIV.

Track listing
"Oh Lord, Search My Heart" (Rev. Gary Davis) – 5:14
"Death Don't Have No Mercy" (Davis) – 6:48
"I Am the Light of This World" (Davis) – 4:02
"Mann's Fate" (Jorma Kaukonen) – 7:00
"Winin' Boy Blues" (Jelly Roll Morton) – 6:54
"Embryonic Journey" (Jorma Kaukonen) – 2:10
"99 Year Blues" (Julius Daniels) – 5:17
"Police Dog (Splashdown) Blues" (Blind Blake) – 4:17
"Sally Where'd You Get Your Liquor From" (Davis) – 4:16
 "Keep Your Lamps Trimmed and Burning" (Davis) – 3:09
"I Know You Rider" (Traditional) – 5:15
"I Want You to Know" (Bo Carter) – 4:12
"Keep On Truckin'" (Bob Carleton) – 4:21
"Candy Man" (Davis) – 6:22

Personnel
Jorma Kaukonen – acoustic guitar, vocals
Jack Casady – bass

Production
Michael Falzarano – producer, remastering
Leslie D. Kippel – executive producer
Frank Pappito – engineer
Toni Brown – liner notes
Barry Glassberg – tape archivist
Arthur L. Field – photography

References

Hot Tuna live albums
1997 live albums
Relix Records live albums